Kamal Vinayakrao Bhandarkar (21 February 1911 – 10 December 1986) was an Indian cricketer who played first-class cricket from 1935 to 1949.

Bhandarkar was a wicketkeeper-batsman. He was a member of the Ranji Trophy winning teams of Maharashtra in 1939–40 and Holkar in 1945–46. Opening the batting for Maharashtra against Kathiawar in the Ranji Trophy in 1948–49, he scored 205 and set a world record second-wicket partnership of 455 with B. B. Nimbalkar, who scored 443 not out. The record stood until 1974.

Bhandarkar later took up coaching, and was one of the leading coaches in India from 1950 until his death in 1986. His pupils included the India Test captains Chandu Borde and Sunil Gavaskar.

Bhandarkar was a science graduate of Nowrosjee Wadia College in Pune, who worked in the zoology department of the college as a demonstrator.

References

External links
 

1911 births
1986 deaths
Maharashtra cricketers
Indian cricketers
Indian cricket coaches
Holkar cricketers
Hindus cricketers
Central India cricketers